The Pulikulam cattle breed name derives from Pulikulam village located in Sivagangai, Tamil Nadu. Also bred in Madurai and Virudhunagar Districts of Tamil Nadu,  is also known as “Palingu maadu”, “Mani maadu”, “Jallikattu maadu”, “Mattu maadu” and “Kilakattu maadu”.  It is an indigenous breed of India. It is popularly used in Jallikkattu.

It is considered to be one of the drought tolerant breeds in South India.

References

Cattle breeds originating in India